Fourth-seeded Dick Savitt defeated Ken McGregor 6–3, 2–6, 6–3, 6–1 in the final to win the men's singles tennis title at the 1951 Australian Championships.

Seeds
The seeded players are listed below. Dick Savitt is the champion; others show the round in which they were eliminated.

  Frank Sedgman (semifinals)
  Arthur Larsen (semifinals)
  Ken McGregor (finalist)
  Dick Savitt (champion)
 n/a
  John Bromwich (quarterfinals)
  Bill Sidwell (second round)
  George Worthington (quarterfinals)
  Adrian Quist (quarterfinals)
  Don Candy (second round)

Draw

Key
 Q = Qualifier
 WC = Wild card
 LL = Lucky loser
 r = Retired

Finals

Earlier rounds

Section 1

Section 2

External links
 

1951
1951 in Australian tennis